Sandra Clark Blanton, known as Sandy Blanton (born 1949), is an accountant from Paoli, Indiana, who served from 2007 to 2011 as a Democratic  member of the Indiana House of Representatives for the 62nd District, which includes her own Orange County in the southern portion of her state.

In 2008, Mrs. Blanton won her second term in the legislature by defeating Republican Daniel Brook Tarr, 13,608 votes (57.4 percent) to his 10,118 (42.6 percent). In 2010, she was unseated in her quest for a third term by Republican Matt Ubelhor, 9,962 (57.4 percent) to her 7,400 (42.6 percent). She sought a comeback in 2012 in District 73, but was defeated by the incumbent Republican Steve Davisson, 13,357 votes (54.5 percent) to 11,160 (45.5 percent).

Blanton is the oldest of four children of Robert Scott Clark, Sr. (1931-2013), and the former Lillian Bruner (1931-2015), both natives of Shelby County, Kentucky. Her father was a pastor, history professor, and a long-term vice president of Southern Baptist-affiliated Campbellsville University in Campbellsville, Kentucky; her mother was a retired English and speech teacher who served for many years on the Tayor County Board of Education in Campbellsville and was a former adjunct professor at Campbellsville University.
 
Blanton graduated from Campbellsville University in 1977. Her husband, Larry R. Blanton (born 1944), an Indiana circuit judge, graduated in 1969 from CU. In 1987, Blanton received the Master of Business Administration degree from Roman Catholic-affiliated Bellarmine University in Louisville, Kentucky. In 2000, she received the Master of Health Care Administration degree from Western Kentucky University in Bowling Green, Kentucky.

An accountant with Southern Indiana Community Healthcare, Blanton is a member of the Mount Pleasant Baptist Church, Phi Beta Psi, and the Democrat Women's Club. Her siblings are Renee Clark Kessler (born 1952) and husband, Marc, of Greensburg, Kentucky, Beverly Clark Manley (born 1957) and husband, Gerald, of Waddy, Kentucky, and Robert S. Clark, Jr. (born 1962), and wife, Mary, of Campbellsville. Robert "Bob" Clark, Jr., was named in April 2016 to succeed his mother on the Taylor County School Board.

References

External links
2012 Campaign Site
Indiana State Legislature - Representative Sandra Blanton Official government website
Project Vote Smart - Representative Sandra 'Sandy' Blanton (IN) profile
Follow the Money - Sandra Blanton
2008 campaign contributions

1949 births
Living people
Democratic Party members of the Indiana House of Representatives
Bellarmine University alumni
Western Kentucky University alumni
Women state legislators in Indiana
Campbellsville University alumni
People from Campbellsville, Kentucky
People from Paoli, Indiana
American accountants
Women accountants
Baptists from Kentucky
Kentucky women in politics
Kentucky women accountants
21st-century American women